Divinity is the study of Christian theology and ministry at a school, divinity school, university, or seminary.  The term is sometimes a synonym for theology as an academic, speculative pursuit, and sometimes is used for the study of applied theology and ministry to make a distinction between that and academic theology.

While it most often refers to Christian study which is linked with the professional degrees for ordained ministry or related work, it is also used in an academic setting by other faith traditions. For example, in many traditional British public schools and universities, the term is often used in place of Religious Studies, which deals with religion more broadly, to describe classes that include theology and philosophy in the context of religion as a whole, rather than just the Christian tradition.

Areas and specializations

Divinity can be divided into several distinct but related disciplines. These vary, sometimes widely, from church to church and from one faith tradition to another, and even among various programs within a particular church. A typical program will include many of the following:

Philosophical theology
 Systematic theology
 Dogmatic theology
 Moral theology or Christian ethics
 Natural theology
 Sacramental theology

Practice of worship
 Liturgics
 Homiletics
 Sacred music

Ministry in the field
 Pastoral theology
 Pastoral counseling
 Religious education techniques

Scriptural study and languages

 Biblical studies or Sacred Scripture
 Biblical Hebrew
 New Testament Greek
 Latin
 Old Church Slavonic

Miscellany
 Canon law
 Church history
 Ecclesiology

Degrees 

Studying divinity usually leads to the awarding of an academic degree or a professional degree.  Such degrees, particularly in modern times the Master of Divinity, are prerequisites for ordained ministry in most Christian denominations and many other faith communities. The exception to this is all "plain" churches such as the Amish, Old German Baptist Brethren, Old Order Mennonite, Dunkard Brethren, and many others. In fact, such churches hold to the belief that seminaries are an institution of man and not supported by Holy Scripture. Students earn such degrees at a free-standing seminary, theologate or divinity school, or at a university.

List of degrees

The following is a list of most of the common degrees in divinity:

 Bachelor of Arts in Theology (B.A. or A.B.)
 Bachelor of Canon Law (J.C.B.; B.L.C.)
 Bachelor of Divinity (B.D.; B.Div.)
 Bachelor of Hebrew Letters (B.H.L.)
 Bachelor of Ministry (B.Min.)
 Bachelor of Religious Education (B.R.E.)
 Bachelor of Sacred Literature (B.S.Litt.)
 Bachelor of Sacred Music (B.Mus. or S.M.B.)
 Bachelor of Sacred Scripture (S.S.B.)
 Bachelor of Sacred Theology (S.T.B.)
 Bachelor of the History and Cultural Patrimony of the Church 
 Bachelor of Theology (B.Th.)
 Lector of Sacred Scripture (S.S.Lect.)
 Lector of Sacred Theology (S.T.Lect.)
 Licentiate of Canon Law (J.C.L.)
 Licentiate of Sacred Music (S.M.L.)
 Licentiate of Sacred Scripture (S.S.L.)
 Licentiate of Sacred Theology (S.T.L.)
 Licentiate of the Cultural Patrimony of the Church 
 Licentiate of the History of the Church 
 Licentiate of Theology (L.Th.)
 Master of Arts in Theology (M.A. or A.M.)
 Master of Arts in Hebrew Letters (M.A.H.L.—used by some Jewish schools)
 Master of the Cultural Patrimony of the Church 
 Master of Divinity (M.Div.—the most common degree taken before ministry in North America)
 Master of Hebrew Letters (M.H.L.—used by some Jewish schools)
 Master of Ministry (M.Min.)
 Master of Philosophy with a specialization in Theology (M.Phil)
 Master of Rabbinic Studies (M.A.R.S.—used by some Jewish schools for Rabbinic ordination)
 Master of Religious Arts (M.R.A.)
 Master of Religious Education (M.R.E.)
 Master of Sacred Literature (M.S.Litt.)
 Master of Sacred Music (M.Mus. or M.S.M.)
 Master of Sacred Theology (S.T.M.)
 Master of Theological Studies (M.T.S.)
 Master of Theology (M.Th., Th.M., M.S.T., or M.Theol.)
 Master of Worship Studies (M.W.S.)
 Doctor of both laws [Doctor of Canon and Civil Laws] (J.U.D.; I.U.D.; D.U.J.; J.U.Dr.; D.U.I.; D.J.U.; Dr.iur.utr.; Dr.jur.utr.; D.I.U.; U.J.D.; U.I.D.)
 Doctor of Canon Law (J.C.D.; I.C.D.; D.C.L.; dr.iur.can.; D.Cnl.; D.D.C.; D.Can.L.)
 Doctor of the Cultural Patrimony of the Church 
 Doctor of Divinity (D.D.)
 Doctor of the History of the Church 
 Doctor of Ministry (D.Min.)
 Doctor of Missiology (D.Miss.)
 Doctor of Philosophy in Theology (Ph.D.)
 Doctor of Practical Theology (D.P.T., D.Th.P.)
 Doctor of Sacred Literature (D.S.Litt.)
 Doctor of Sacred Music (D.M.A., D.S.M., S.M.D.)
 Doctor of Sacred Scripture (S.S.D.)
 Doctor of Sacred Theology (S.T.D.)
 Doctor of Theology (Th.D., Dr. Theol., D.Theol.)
 Doctor of Worship Studies (D.W.S.)

See also

 Doctorate 
 Licentiate
 History Curriculum at the Gregorian University 
 Postdoctoral research

Christian education
Christianity studies

References